A referendum ratifying the new constitution of the Consulate, which made Napoleon Bonaparte First Consul for life, was held on 10 May 1802. The official result showed 99.76% of voters in favour of the change. Of seven million eligible voters, 49.45% abstained. 

1802 in France
Referendums in France
1802 referendums
Constitutional referendums in France
May 1802 events